Angela Walsh (born 1986) is an Irish sportsperson. She plays ladies' Gaelic football with her local club Inch Rovers and has been a member of the senior Cork county ladies' football team since 2004.  Walsh captained Cork to a fourth consecutive All-Ireland title in 2008.

References

1986 births
Living people
Cork inter-county ladies' footballers
Ireland women's international rules football team players
Winners of four All-Ireland medals (ladies' football)
Dual camogie–football players
Cork camogie players